Phymaraphiniidae is a family of sea sponges.

Genera 
Exsuperantia Özdikmen, 2009
Kaliapsis Bowerbank, 1869
Lepidothenea de Laubenfels, 1936

References
 

Tetractinellida